Danish Canadians (Danish: Dansk-canadiere) are Canadian citizens of Danish ancestry. According to the 2006 Census, there were 200,035 Canadians with Danish background, 17,650 of whom were born in Denmark.

Canada became an important destination for the Danes during the post-war period. At one point, a Canadian immigration office was to be set up in Copenhagen. While most of the post-war immigrants settled in large cities, Danish-Canadian communities can be found in all of Canada's ten provinces.

The oldest Danish community in Canada is New Denmark, New Brunswick, first inhabited by Danish immigrants in 1872.

History

Notable Danish Canadians
Earl W. Bascom – rodeo pioneer, artist, inventor, actor, Canada's Sports Hall of Fame inductee
Karen Bulow – textile artist
Erik Christensen – NHL player from the New York Rangers
Hayden Christensen – actor (Danish paternal grandparents)
Scott Frandsen – Olympic athlete
Ann Hansen – former anarchist
Glenna Hansen – Inuvialuit politician
Rick Hansen – paraplegic athlete
Valdy/Valdemar Horsdal – Singer-Songwriter
Carly Rae Jepsen – pop singer
K.V. Johansen – writer
Rasmus Lerdorf – programmer
Erik Nielsen – Deputy Prime Minister of Canada from 1984 to 1986
Leslie Nielsen – actor and comedian (Danish father)
Robert Nielsen – journalist
Kaj Pindal – animator and animation educator
Alf Erling Porsild – botanist
Knud Simonsen – inventor, industrialist, entrepreneur
Luke Skaarup – strength athlete, strongman
Lauren Southern – political activist (Danish father)
Jens Haven – Missionary and Settler

See also

References 

 
Danish

Danish diaspora
Danish